is a Japanese musician, singer, lyricist and composer. She is noted for having penned and composed songs for various anime and video games, including popular titles like Zettai Shōnen, Azumanga Daioh, Haibane Renmei, Suzumiya Haruhi no Yūutsu, Rocket Knight Adventures, Lucky Star, the media franchise Love Live!, and for various singers and voice actresses. She was a composer for Konami and Treasure.

Aki Hata also sings herself. She is a member of the band Tsukihiko, providing the vocals and keyboard.

Discography

Solo works

Albums
 1999-02-20: Kan'okejima
 1999-02-20: Sekai Nante Owarinasai
 2006-12-22: Roman Tsukira no Musumetachi ~BEST SONGS~
 2007-12-21: Reizoku Kaibi no Musumetachi ~BEST SONGS II~
 2014-19-03: Aisuru hito yo shinjitsu wa chikawazu ni iyou

Singles
 2000-24-05: Bitsuu no rakuen
 2000-23-08: Yokan no tenshi wo dakishimete
 2010-13-10: Bannou ni tagiru ikasama
 2010-22-12: Dangai no unuboreya
 2011-21-12: Haikin seija waga machi o susuman
 2016-05-25: Kobore Sekai Oware

Tsukihiko works
 2005-09-20: Gen wa Jubaku no Yubi de Naru
 2005-09-20: Tōhi Oukoku no Metsubō
 2006-06-23: Tōhi Oukoku no Densetsu

References

External links
 Official website
 Tsukihiko official site
 Aki Hata @ HearJapan (English)

1966 births
Anime musicians
Japanese composers
Japanese women composers
Japanese lyricists
Living people
Musicians from Tokyo
Video game composers